Julian Marshall is a British journalist and radio broadcaster working for the BBC.  Marshall is one of the main presenters of Newshour on the BBC World Service.

Early life 
Marshall studied at University in Rhodesia, now Zimbabwe and then later in Britain.

Career 
Marshall joined the BBC in 1975, before joining the BBC World Service in 1977.  He then spent a period reporting from across Africa for the service.  Marshall was a presenter of BBC World Service Television from its launch in 1991.  He has remained an occasional relief presenter on the subsequent channels BBC World, and BBC World News.

Since 1991 Marshall has been one of the main presenters of the World Service's flagship news strand Newshour.

Awards 
The recipient of two Sony Gold Awards, Marshall received the first of these for 'best reaction to a news event: the release of Nelson Mandela.'

References

BBC newsreaders and journalists
BBC World Service presenters
British radio presenters
Living people
Year of birth missing (living people)